is a curler from Aomori, Japan.

Mayo Yamaura made her debut at a major curling competition at the 2008 World Championships in Vernon, British Columbia, Canada. She threw second stones. Team Japan, along with Team China, made history by becoming the first teams from the Pacific region to advance to the Medal Rounds at a Curling World Championship.

She played for Team Japan at the 2010 Winter Olympics in Vancouver, British Columbia, Canada. Yamaura served as the Alternate for the team.

Teammates 
2010 Vancouver Olympic Games

Moe Meguro, Skip
Anna Ohmiya, Third
Mari Motohashi, Second
Kotomi Ishizaki, Lead

References

External links
 

1984 births
Living people
Japanese female curlers
Olympic curlers of Japan
Curlers at the 2010 Winter Olympics
Universiade medalists in curling
Universiade bronze medalists for Japan
Competitors at the 2007 Winter Universiade
Medalists at the 2007 Winter Universiade